Heart of Steel may refer to:

 "Heart of Steel" (Batman: The Animated Series), a two part episode in the first season
 "Heart of Steel" (Tvorchi song), the song representing Ukraine in the Eurovision Song Contest 2023
 "Heart of Steel", a song from the 1988 album Kings of Metal by Manowar
 "Heart of Steel", a song from the 1996 album Underworld by Divinyls
 Hearts of Steel, a Protestant movement in Ireland
 The Heart of Steel, a 2006 documentary film